Ulanga is a village in Kilosa District, Morogoro Region of central Tanzania. It is just west of the Mikumi National Park.

Notes

Populated places in Morogoro Region
Kilosa District